Starboy or Star Boy may refer to:

 Starboy (album), a 2016 album by the Weeknd
 "Starboy" (song), the title track from the album by the Weeknd
 Star boy, at Christmas
 Star Boy, a character in the Legion of Super-Heroes from DC Comics
 "Star Boy", a song by Buffy Sainte Marie from Buffy
 Starboy Entertainment, a record label founded by Nigerian singer Wizkid
 "Starboy", a song by Guided by Voices from Same Place the Fly Got Smashed
 Starboy, an Amstrad CPC game
 Starboy Award, at the Oulu International Children's and Youth Film Festival
 InterPlane Starboy, proposed Czech homebuilt aircraft designed by InterPlane Aircraft of Zbraslavice

People
 Star Boy, Mexican wrestler, see Caravana de Campeones (2008)
 Star Boy, Jr. (born 1993), Mexican wrestler, son of wrestler Star Boy
 Starboy Nathan (born 1986), English R&B singer
 Matt Bowden ("Starboy"), rock musician and activist from New Zealand